ʾAḥmad ibn Yaḥyā ibn Jābir al-Balādhurī  was a 9th-century Muslim historian. One of the eminent Middle Eastern historians of his age, he spent most of his life in Baghdad and enjoyed great influence at the court of the caliph al-Mutawakkil. He travelled in Syria and Iraq, compiling information for his major works.

His full name was Ahmad Bin Yahya Bin Jabir Al-Baladhuri , Balazry Ahmad Bin Yahya Bin Jabir Abul Hasan or Abi al-Hassan Baladhuri.

Biography
Al-Baladhuri's ethnicity has been described as Arab and Persian, although his sympathies seem to have been strongly with the Arabs, for Masudi refers to one of his works in which he rejects Baladhuri's condemnation of non-Arab nationalism  Shu'ubiyya.

He lived at the court of the caliphs al-Mutawakkil and Al-Musta'in and was tutor to the son of al-Mutazz. He died in 892 as the result of a drug called baladhur (hence his name). (Baladhur is Semecarpus anacardium, known as the "marking nut"; medieval Arabic and Jewish writers describe it as a memory-enhancer).

Works

His chief extant work, a condensation of a longer history, Kitab Futuh al-Buldan  (فتوح البلدان), "Book of the Conquests of Lands", translated by Phillip Hitti (1916) and Francis Clark Murgotten (1924) in The Origins of the Islamic State, tells of the wars and conquests of the Arabs from the 7th century, and the terms made with the residents of the conquered territories. It covers the conquests of lands from Arabia west to Egypt, North Africa, and Spain and east to Iraq, Iran, and Sind.

His history, in turn, was much used by later writers. Ansab al-Ashraf  (أنساب الأشراف, “Lineage of the Nobles”), also extant, is a biographical work in genealogical order devoted to the Arab aristocracy, from Muhammad and his contemporaries to the Umayyad and Abbāsid caliphs. It contains histories of the reigns of rulers.

His discussions of the rise and fall of powerful dynasties provide a political moral. His commentaries on methodology are sparse, other than assertions of accuracy.

See also
List of Iranian scholars
List of Islamic scholars

References

Further reading

External links

Al-Balādhurī, britannica.com 

892 deaths
9th-century Iranian historians
Year of birth unknown
9th-century Arabic writers
Court scholars
Courtiers of the Abbasid Caliphate
Iranian historians of Islam
820 births